Iuliu Madarasz (1898 – 1969) was a Romanian footballer who played as a defender.

International career
Iuliu Madarasz played four matches for Romania, making his debut on 21 April 1929 under coach Constantin Rădulescu in a friendly which ended with a 3–0 victory against Bulgaria.

Scores and results table. Romania's goal tally first:

References

External links
 

1898 births
1969 deaths
Romanian footballers
Romania international footballers
Place of birth missing
Association football defenders
Liga I players
Banatul Timișoara players